Henry William Portman (died 11 January 1796) was an 18th-century housing developer, the ancestor of the Viscounts Portman.

Biography
He was the son and heir of Henry William Berkeley Portman (d.1761), MP, by his wife Anne Fitch. His grandfather was William Berkeley (d.1737) of Pylle, Somerset, who had changed his surname to Portman on becoming heir to his distant cousin Sir William Portman, 6th Baronet (d.1690) of Orchard Portman, Somerset—as well as quartering the Portman arms with his own. He succeeded his father in the estates of Bryanston and Orchard Portman in 1761, and to the Berkeley estates at Pylle on the death of his aunt Lady Burland. He developed  of meadow in London (between Oxford Street and the present site of Regent's Canal) he had inherited from his Tudor ancestor Sir William Portman, turning it into the Portman Estate. He began issuing its first building leases in 1755, and building began in 1764 with Portman Square, which was to owe its popularity to buildings by Robert Adam and James ‘Athenian’ Stuart.  His development work was continued by his son Edward Berkeley Portman (d.1823), father of Edward Berkeley Portman, 1st Viscount Portman (d.1888).

References

External links
http://www.portmanestate.co.uk/heritage/restoration.html
 John Burke, A Genealogical and Heraldic History of the Commoners of Great Britain and Ireland, London 1834,  vol. I, p. 62-64

Housebuilding companies of the United Kingdom
Henry William Portman